Seán Óg Ó Ciardubháin (born 198? in County Kerry) is an Irish player of Gaelic football. He is best known for playing for the Kerry Junior team and has won 2 All Ireland titles in 2006 and 2012. He has also won 4 Munster titles with the same team.  He plays club football with Cordal.

References

 

Living people
Year of birth uncertain
Gaelic football goalkeepers
Kerry inter-county Gaelic footballers
Cordal Gaelic footballers
Year of birth missing (living people)